Exallandra is a subgenus of hoverflies in the subfamily Syrphinae, within the genus Sphaerophoria.

Species
 Sphaerophoria cinctifacies (Speiser, 1910)
 Sphaerophoria loewii Zetterstedt, 1843

References

Syrphini
Diptera of Africa